Qezeljeh Gol (also known as Qezelcheh Gol) is a village in Hajjilar-e Shomali Rural District, Hajjilar District, Chaypareh County, West Azerbaijan Province, Iran. At the 2006 census, its population was 64, in 14 families.

References 

Populated places in Chaypareh County